Karen Valeria Flores Estrella (born 24 July 2001) is an Ecuadorian footballer who plays as a forward for American collegiate team Cal State Bakersfield Roadrunners and the Ecuador women's national team.

Early life
Flores was raised in Pichincha.

College career
Flores has attended the California State University, Bakersfield in the United States.

International career
Flores made her senior debut for Ecuador on 27 October 2020.

References

2001 births
Living people
People from Pichincha Province
Ecuadorian women's footballers
Women's association football forwards
Cal State Bakersfield Roadrunners women's soccer players
Ecuador women's international footballers
Ecuadorian expatriate footballers
Ecuadorian expatriate sportspeople in the United States
Expatriate women's soccer players in the United States
21st-century Ecuadorian women